Valmir Berisha (born 6 June 1996) is a Swedish professional footballer who plays as a forward for Minaur Baia Mare.

Club career

Roma
Having played for Halmstads BK as a youth, Berisha signed a 2.5-year contract with Roma in January 2014.

Loan to Panathinaikos
He joined Panathinaikos on loan during the 2014–15 season. He made his Superleague debut on 3 May 2015 against PAE Kerkyra replacing Nikos Karelis after 80 minutes in a 1–1 draw.

Cambuur
In July 2015, he again left Roma temporarily, moving to Dutch club SC Cambuur on loan for the 2015–16 with the option of a further season.

Aalesund
After Cambuur, he moved to Aalesunds FK in 2017, but was loaned out to Fjölnir in 2018, where he stayed until his loan ended in January 2019.

Velež Mostar
On 19 February 2019, Berisha signed for First League FBiH club FK Velež Mostar on a 1-year contract with the possibility of an extension for one more year. He made his debut for Velež on 16 March 2019, in a 2–0 home league win against NK Jedinstvo Bihać.

He scored his first goal for Velež on 27 April 2019, in a 4–0 home league win against FK Rudar Kakanj. On 25 May 2019, Berisha won the First League of FBiH with Velež after the club beat NK Bosna Visoko 0–2 away and got promoted to the Premier League of Bosnia and Herzegovina. He scored his first Premier League goal for Velež on 20 July 2019, in a 1–3 home loss against FK Mladost Doboj Kakanj. Berisha left Velež in January 2020.

Chindia Târgoviște
On 23 January 2020, Berisha signed a one-and-a-half-year contract with Romanian club Chindia Târgoviște.

Sliema Wanderers
Berisha moved to Sliema, Malta with Sliema Wanderers F.C. for season 2021-22.

International career
Berisha was a member of the Swedish under-17 national team that finished third at the 2013 FIFA U-17 World Cup and finished as the top scorer in the competition with seven goals. He represented the Sweden Olympic football team at the 2016 Summer Olympics in Rio de Janeiro, Brazil.

Personal life 
He was born in Kosovo to Kosovo Albanian parents before moving to Sweden at a young age.

Career statistics

Club

Honours
Velež Mostar
First League of FBiH: 2018–19
Sweden U17
 FIFA U-17 World Cup third place: 2013
Individual
 FIFA U-17 World Cup Golden Boot: 2013

References

External links
 

1996 births
Living people
Swedish footballers
Sweden youth international footballers
Association football forwards
Super League Greece players
Eredivisie players
Eliteserien players
Valmir Berisha
Premier League of Bosnia and Herzegovina players
First League of the Federation of Bosnia and Herzegovina players
Liga I players
Liga II players
Panathinaikos F.C. players
SC Cambuur players
Aalesunds FK players
Valmir Berisha
FK Velež Mostar players
AFC Chindia Târgoviște players
ASC Oțelul Galați players
CS Minaur Baia Mare (football) players
Swedish expatriate footballers
Expatriate footballers in Italy
Expatriate footballers in Greece
Expatriate footballers in the Netherlands
Expatriate footballers in Norway
Expatriate footballers in Iceland
Expatriate footballers in Bosnia and Herzegovina
Expatriate footballers in Romania
Swedish expatriate sportspeople in Italy
Swedish expatriate sportspeople in Greece
Swedish expatriate sportspeople in the Netherlands
Swedish expatriate sportspeople in Norway
Swedish expatriate sportspeople in Iceland
Swedish expatriate sportspeople in Bosnia and Herzegovina
Swedish expatriate sportspeople in Romania
Kosovan emigrants to Sweden
Swedish people of Kosovan descent
Footballers at the 2016 Summer Olympics
Olympic footballers of Sweden